Pieve Ligure (locally ) is a comune (municipality) in the Metropolitan City of Genoa in the Italian region Liguria, located about  southeast of Genoa.

The pieve of St. Michael Archangel, from which the town takes its name, has been rebuilt in Baroque style in the 18th century and houses works by Perin del Vaga e Luigi Morgari. The other main church is the Oratory of St. Anthony Abbot (early 15th century). The Castello Cirla originated as a medieval Saracen tower, although it was turned into a private residence in 1909.

References

External links
 media.supereva.it/pieveligure.freeweb/

Cities and towns in Liguria